The 1954 Arkansas gubernatorial election was held on November 2, 1954.

Incumbent Democratic Governor Francis Cherry was narrowly defeated in the Democratic primary.

Democratic nominee Orval Faubus defeated Republican nominee Pratt C. Remmel with 62.09% of the vote.

Primary elections
Primary elections were held on July 27, 1954, with the Democratic runoff held on August 10, 1954.

Democratic primary

Candidates
Francis Cherry, incumbent Governor
Orval Faubus, newspaper publisher and former Director of State Highway Commission
Guy H. Jones, State Senator
Gus McMillan, real estate dealer

Results

General election

Candidates
Orval Faubus, Democratic
Pratt C. Remmel, Republican, Former insurance executive, Mayor of Little Rock

Results
Remmel's showing against Faubus was the best showing by a non-Democrat since 1888 and by a Republican since 1872.

References

Bibliography
 

1954
Arkansas
Gubernatorial
November 1954 events in the United States